The Council of Europe Convention on Preventing and Combating Violence Against Women and Domestic Violence, better known as the Istanbul Convention, is a human rights treaty of the Council of Europe opposing violence against women and domestic violence which was opened for signature on 11 May 2011, in Istanbul, Turkey. The convention aims at prevention of violence, victim protection and to end the impunity of perpetrators. As of March 2019, it has been signed by 45 countries and the European Union. On 12 March 2012, Turkey became the first country to ratify the convention, followed by 37 other countries from 2013 to 2022 (Albania, Andorra, Austria, Belgium, Bosnia and Herzegovina, Croatia, Cyprus, Denmark, Estonia, Finland, France, Georgia, Germany, Greece, Iceland, Ireland, Italy, Liechtenstein, Luxembourg, Malta, Moldova, Monaco, Montenegro, the Netherlands, North Macedonia, Norway, Poland, Portugal, Romania, San Marino, Serbia, Slovenia, Spain, Sweden, Switzerland, Ukraine, United Kingdom). The Convention came into force on 1 August 2014. In 2021, Turkey became the first and only country to withdraw from the convention, after denouncing it on 20 March 2021. The convention ceased to be effective in Turkey on 1 July 2021, following its denunciation.

History 

The Council of Europe has undertaken a series of initiatives to promote the protection of women against violence since the 1990s. In particular, these initiatives have resulted in the adoption, in 2002, of the Council of Europe Recommendation Rec(2002)5 of the Committee of Ministers to member states on the protection of women against violence, and the running of a Europe-wide campaign, from 2006 to 2008, to combat violence against women, including domestic violence. The Parliamentary Assembly of the Council of Europe has also taken a firm political stance against all forms of violence against women. It has adopted a number of resolutions and recommendations calling for legally-binding standards on preventing, protecting against and prosecuting the most severe and widespread forms of gender-based violence.

National reports, studies and surveys revealed the magnitude of the problem in Europe. The campaign in particular showed a large variation in Europe of national responses to violence against women and domestic violence. Thus, the need for harmonized legal standards to ensure that victims benefit from the same level of protection everywhere in Europe became apparent. The Ministers of Justice of Council of Europe member states began discussing the need to step up protection from domestic violence, in particular intimate partner violence.

The Council of Europe decided it was necessary to set comprehensive standards to prevent and combat violence against women and domestic violence. In December 2008, the Committee of Ministers set up an expert group mandated to prepare a draft convention in this field. Over the course of just over two years, this group, called the CAHVIO (Ad Hoc Committee for preventing and combating violence against women and domestic violence), developed a draft text. During the later stage of drafting of the convention, UK, Italy, Russia, and the Holy See proposed several amendments to limit the requirements provided by the convention. These amendments were criticized by Amnesty International. The final draft of the convention was produced in December 2010.

Main provisions 

The Istanbul Convention is the first legally-binding instrument which "creates a comprehensive legal framework and approach to combat violence against women" and is focused on preventing domestic violence, protecting victims and prosecuting accused offenders.

It characterizes violence against women as a violation of human rights and a form of discrimination (Art.3(a)). Countries should exercise due diligence when preventing violence, protecting victims and prosecuting perpetrators (Art. 5). The convention also contains a definition of gender: for the purpose of the Convention gender is defined in Article 3(c) as "the socially constructed roles, behaviours, activities and attributes that a given society considers appropriate for women and men". Moreover, the treaty establishes a series of offences characterized as violence against women. States which ratify the Convention must criminalize several offences, including: psychological violence (Art.33); stalking (Art.34); physical violence (Art.35); sexual violence, including rape, explicitly covering all engagement in non-consensual acts of a sexual nature with a person (Art.36), forced marriage (Art.37); female genital mutilation (Art.38), forced abortion and forced sterilisation (Art.39). The Convention states that sexual harassment must be subject to "criminal or other legal sanction" (Art. 40). The convention also includes an article targeting crimes committed in the name of "so-called honour" (Art. 42).

Structure 

The convention contains 81 articles separated into 12 chapters. Its structure follows the structure of the Council of Europe's most recent conventions. The structure of the instrument is based on the "four Ps": Prevention, Protection and support of victims, Prosecution of offenders and Integrated Policies. Each area foresees a series of specific measures. The convention also establishes obligations in relation to the collection of data and supporting research in the field of violence against women (Art. 11).

The preamble recalls the European Convention on Human Rights, European Social Charter and Convention on Action against Trafficking in Human Beings as well as international human rights treaties by United Nations and Rome Statute of the International Criminal Court. In Article 2, this Convention indicates that the provisions shall apply in time of peace and also in situations of armed conflicts in violence against women and domestic violence. Article 3 defines key terms: 
"violence against women" is "violation of human rights and a form of discrimination against women and shall mean all acts of gender-based violation that result in, or are likely to result in physical, sexual, psychological, or economic harm or suffering to women including threats of such acts, coercion or arbitrary deprivation of liberty, whether occurring in public or private life", 
"domestic violence": "all acts of physical, sexual, psychological or economic violence that occur with the family or domestic unit or between former or current spouses or partners, whether or not the perpetrator shares or has shared the same residence with the victim."
"gender": means "the socially constructed roles, behaviours, activities and attributes that a given society considers appropriate for women and men."
"gender-based violence against women": means "violence that is directed against a woman because she is a woman or that affects women disproportionately."

Article 4 prohibits several types of discrimination stating: The implementation of the provisions of this convention by the Parties, in particular measure to protect the rights of victims, shall be secured without discrimination on any ground such as sex, gender, race, colour, language political or other opinion, national or social origin, association with a national minority, property, birth, sexual orientation, gender identity, age, state of health, disability, marital status, migrant or refugee status, or other status.

Monitoring mechanism GREVIO 
The convention mandates an independent expert body, the Group of Experts on Action against Violence against Women and Domestic Violence (GREVIO), with monitoring the implementation of the convention. Its members are elected by the state parties; depending on the number of state parties the body consists of between ten and fifteen members.

The first ten members were elected in 2014: President Feride Acar (Turkey), First Vice-president Marceline Naudi (Malta), Second Vice-president Simona Lanzoni (Italy), and members Biljana Brankovic (Serbia), Françoise Brie (France), Gemma Gallego (Spain), Helena Leitao (Portugal), Rosa Logar (Austria), Iris Luarasi (Albania) and Vesna Ratkovic (Montenegro).

Five additional members were elected in 2018: Per Arne Håkansson (Sweden), Sabine Kräuter-Stockton (Germany), Vladimer Mkervalishvili (Georgia), Rachel Eapen Paul (Norway) and Aleid van den Brink (Netherlands).

Adoption, signature, ratification and denunciation

General process 
The draft of the convention was adopted by the Council of Europe Ministers Deputies on 7 April 2011 on the occasion of the 1111th meeting. It opened for signature on 11 May 2011 on the occasion of the 121st Session of the Committee of Ministers in Istanbul. It entered into force following 10 ratifications, eight of which were required to be member states of the Council of Europe. As of December 2015, the convention was signed by 39 states, followed by ratification of the minimum eight Council of Europe states: Albania, Austria, Bosnia and Herzegovina, Italy, Montenegro, Portugal, Serbia, and Turkey. Later that year, it was ratified by Andorra, Denmark, France, Malta, Monaco, Spain, and Sweden. In 2015, it was ratified also by Finland, the Netherlands, Poland and Slovenia, and in 2016, by Belgium, San Marino and Romania; in 2017 by Cyprus, Estonia, Georgia, Germany, Norway, and Switzerland, in 2018 by Croatia, Greece, Iceland, Luxembourg and Republic of Macedonia, and in 2019, by Republic of Ireland. On 13 June 2017, European Commissioner Věra Jourová (Gender Equality) signed the Istanbul Convention on behalf of the European Union. On 20 June 2022 the Ukrainian parliament ratified the treaty. States that have ratified the convention are legally bound by its provisions once it enters into force.

The convention can be denounced through a notification to the COE Secretary General (Article 80) and enters into force three months after that notification.

Bulgaria 

In January 2018, the Council of Ministers of Bulgaria adopted a proposal to the Parliament to ratify the convention. The decision was quickly condemned by some government ministers, members of parliament, media groups and civic organisations, who suggested that the convention would eventually lead to a formal recognition of a third gender and same-sex marriage. After widespread backlash, the third Borisov Government postponed the ratification and transferred the decision to the Constitutional Court, which would rule whether it would be legal. President Rumen Radev, an opponent of the ratification, hailed the postponement as a "triumph of common sense", stating that the convention is ambiguous and that domestic violence can only be addressed by adequate Bulgarian laws and improved law enforcement.

Prime Minister Boyko Borisov cited the isolation of his GERB party, which was not supported even by its coalition partner, the far-right United Patriots. Borisov expressed surprise that the opposition Bulgarian Socialist Party (BSP) was firmly against the convention as well, and suggested that the Socialists are opposing the European Union altogether. The BSP declared itself firmly against the convention, causing a rift between the Party of European Socialists and the BSP's new political line under Korneliya Ninova. According to the Socialists' "Vision for Bulgaria" programme, the convention is "not meant to protect women. The convention is against fundamental values of European civilisation".

On 27 July 2018, the Constitutional Court pronounced Resolution No 13 on Constitutional Case No. 3/2018 stating that "the Council of Europe Convention on preventing and combating violence against women and domestic violence, does not comply with the Constitution of the Republic of Bulgaria". In its decision, the Court identified a relation between previous Council of Europe documents against domestic violence and the expansion of transgender rights. According to the Constitutional Court, the convention offers a binary interpretation of gender as both a biological and social category, which contradicts the constitution of Bulgaria, where humans are irrevocably defined as biologically male or female, with equal standing as citizens. The convention therefore lays formal ground to promote non-biological definitions of gender, which are deemed unconstitutional.

Women's rights groups were outraged by the Bulgarian government's decision not to ratify the Istanbul Convention. In November 2018, on the occasion of the International Day for the Elimination of Violence against Women, hundreds of people demonstrated in the centre of Sofia against violence against women under the motto #YouAreNotAlone (#НеСиСама), demanding effective action from the institutions including the creation of prevention programmes and shelters for victims. The organisers, the Bulgarian Fund for Women, cited the fact that in the first eleven months of 2018, almost 30 women were killed in Bulgaria, most of them by their partners.

Hungary 
In May 2020, the National Assembly adopted a political declaration in which it called on the government not to go any further in acceding to the convention and to lobby the European Union to do the same. The declaration was adopted with 115 votes in favour, 35 against and three abstentions.

Moldova 
The Parliament of Moldova ratified the Convention on 14 October 2021, and it entered into force in Moldova on 1 May 2021.

Slovakia 
Conservative, Christian democratic, Roman Catholic, nationalist and far-right groups and parties in Slovakia have been opposed to the country ratifying the convention, especially because of its clauses concerning LGBT rights, which they portrayed as "extreme liberalism" that corrodes "traditional values" they felt needed to be protected. On 29 March 2019, one day before the 2019 Slovak presidential election, nationalist politicians forced through a parliamentary resolution asking Slovakia's government not to ratify the Istanbul Convention, in an effort to mobilise conservative voters to vote for Maroš Šefčovič instead of the progressive candidate Zuzana Čaputová, who had been supporting LGBT rights and women's right to abortion. Although Čaputová won the election and became Slovakia's first female president, conservative groups stepped up their campaign to prevent Slovakia from ratifying the convention and restricting access to abortion in the following months. On 25 February 2020, the Parliament of Slovakia, the National Council, rejected the Convention at an extraordinary session by a vote of 17–96 (37 absent). Following the decision of Parliament, President Zuzana Čaputová sent a letter to the Council of Europe on 6 March 2020, informing it that the Slovak Republic could not become a party to the Istanbul Convention. Presidential spokesperson :sk:Martin Strižinec commented: "Since the necessary condition to ratify the convention is the consent of Parliament, but this hasn't happened, this convention won't be ratified by the president," adding that Čaputová repeatedly stated that if Parliament decided on the document in a constitutionally prescribed manner, she would respect the will of its members.

Poland 
In July 2020, Polish Justice Minister Zbigniew Ziobro declared he will begin preparing the formal process to withdraw from the treaty. He said that the treaty is harmful because it requires that schools teach children about gender in an "ideological way" and de-emphasizes biological sex. In 2012, when in opposition, Ziobro had referred to the treaty as "an invention, a feminist creation aimed at justifying gay ideology". The Polish government also criticized the treaty for stating that "culture, custom, religion, tradition or so-called 'honour' shall not be regarded as justification" for acts of violence against women. In Warsaw, hundreds of people demonstrated against the withdrawal. The announcement was made soon after the European Union relaxed the link between funding and the rule of law, under pressure from Poland and Hungary. The Council of Europe stated "Leaving the Istanbul Convention would be highly regrettable and a major step backwards in the protection of women against violence in Europe."

Turkey 
On 20 March 2021, the Turkish President Recep Tayyip Erdoğan announced his country's withdrawal from the convention by a presidential decree published in the Official Gazette of the Republic of Turkey. The notification for withdrawal has been reported to the Secretary-General by Turkey on 22 March 2021 and the Secretary-General has announced that denunciation will enter into force on 1 July 2021. The withdrawal has been criticized both domestically and internationally, including by the opposition parties in the country, foreign leaders, the Council of Europe, NGOs and on social media. The CoE Secretary-General Marija Pejčinović Burić described the decision as "devastating news" and a "huge setback" that compromises the protection of women in Turkey and abroad. A spokesperson of the Republican People's Party (CHP) claimed that the agreement cannot be withdrawn without parliamentary approval, since it was approved by parliament on 24 November 2011. According to the CHP and various lawyers, the right to approve the withdrawal belongs to the parliament according to Article 90 of the Constitution. However, the government claims that the president has the authority to withdraw from international agreements as stated in article 3 of the presidential decree no. 9. The decision sparked protests across Turkey and comes at a time where the domestic violence against women and femicides in the country are soaring. US President Joe Biden described the move as "deeply disappointing", while the EU's foreign policy chief Josep Borrell urged the authorities to reverse the decision. In an official statement, the Turkish Presidency blamed the LGBT community for the withdrawal from the convention, arguing that "the Istanbul Convention, originally intended to promote women’s rights, was hijacked by a group of people attempting to normalize homosexuality – which is incompatible with Turkey’s social and family values. Hence, the decision to withdraw.". That view is shared by conservative groups and officials from Erdoğan's Islamic-oriented ruling party, the Justice and Development Party (AKP), who claim that the agreement is promoting homosexuality, encouraging divorce and undermining what constitutes a "sacred" family in their view. Answering to criticism over the legality of withdrawal by the Presidency instead of Parliament, Erdoğan insisted that the withdrawal was "completely legal".

On 29 June, the Council of State rejected a motion for stay of execution regarding Erdogan's sole decision to withdraw from the Istanbul Convention on violence against women and ruled that it was legal for Erdoğan to withdraw the country out of the convention since the authority to ratify and annul international agreements was among the president's powers, according to Article 104 of the constitution.

Ukraine 

Ukraine's legislation in the field of (sexual) violence against women and domestic violence had been relatively weak at the start of the 21st century, and the penalties low.
 In 2011, the Ukrainian government (under president Yanukovych) was one of the authors and first signers of the Istanbul Convention, but tough parliamentary opposition prevented its implementation in subsequent years. In 2016, a majority of parliament still voted against ratification, partly because several churches and conservative politicians had difficulty with the text. Meanwhile, the risk of women to become victims of gender-based violence significantly increased in eastern Ukraine ever since the Russo-Ukrainian War began in 2014. Throughout the 2010s and early 2020s, several Ukrainian organisations campaigned for better protection of human rights, pushing for ratification of the Convention as a means of achieving that goal. On 6 December 2017, the Ukrainian parliament and government (under president Poroshenko) adopted several amendments to its Criminal Code, including consent-based definitions of sexual violence, in order to implement the Istanbul Convention. The 2022 Russian invasion of Ukraine, which resulted in a surge of reports of domestic and sexual violence committed against civilians, particularly in the Russian-occupied territories, coupled with the Ukrainian government's desire to join the European Union and gain European support against the invasion, were compelling reasons for eventually ratifying the treaty in its entirety. On 18 June 2022, president Zelenskyy registered in Parliament a bill on the ratification of the Istanbul Convention. On 20 June 2022, the Verkhovna Rada of Ukraine supported the ratification of the Istanbul Convention by 259 votes against 8. Ukraine submitted its instrument of ratification on 18 July 2022, meaning the Convention will enter into force in Ukraine on 1 November 2022.

United Kingdom 
The United Kingdom submitted its instrument of ratification on 21 July 2022, meaning the Convention will enter into force in the UK on 1 November 2022.

Criticism 

In a press release in November 2018, the Council of Europe stated, "Despite its clearly stated aims, several religious and ultra conservative groups have been spreading false narratives about the Istanbul Convention". The release stated that the convention does not seek to impose a certain lifestyle or interfere with personal organization of private life; instead, it seeks only to prevent violence against women and domestic violence. The release states that "the convention is certainly not about ending sexual differences between women and men. Nowhere does the convention ever imply that women and men are or should be 'the same' and that "the convention does not seek to regulate family life and/or family structures: it neither contains a definition of 'family' nor does it promote a particular type of family setting."

According to Balkan Insight, criticism of the convention, strongest in central and Eastern Europe and mainly by the far right and national conservatives, has little foundation in its actual content. "Using disinformation, populist rhetoric, and appeals to Christian and Islamic morality, [critics] have managed to reframe what is essentially a set of guidelines that creates 'a comprehensive legal framework and approach to combat violence against women', into a sinister attempt by Western Europeans to foist their overly-liberal policies on reluctant societies further east."

See also 

Anti-gender movement
Convention on the Elimination of All Forms of Discrimination Against Women (CEDAW)
Declaration on the Elimination of Violence Against Women (DEVAW)
Vienna Declaration and Programme of Action (VDPA)
Inter-American Convention on the Prevention, Punishment, and Eradication of Violence against Women (Belém do Pará Convention)
Protocol to the African Charter on Human and Peoples' Rights on the Rights of Women in Africa (Maputo Protocol)
Expert Group Meeting (EGM): prevention of violence against women and girls
International human rights law
International framework of sexual violence
List of Council of Europe treaties
Preventing and Combating Violence Against Women and Domestic Violence (Ratification of Convention) Act 2017

Notes

References

Further reading

External links 

Official Convention website
Convention text
Signatures and Ratifications

2011 in Turkey
2011 in women's history
Council of Europe treaties
Treaties entered into force in 2014
Treaties concluded in 2011
Treaties of Albania
Treaties of Andorra
Treaties of Austria
Treaties of Belgium
Treaties of Bosnia and Herzegovina
Treaties of Denmark
Treaties of Finland
Treaties of France
Treaties of Italy
Treaties of Malta
Treaties of Monaco
Treaties of Montenegro
Treaties of the Netherlands
Treaties of Poland
Treaties of Portugal
Treaties of North Macedonia
Treaties of Romania
Treaties of Serbia
Treaties of Slovenia
Treaties of Spain
Treaties of Sweden
Treaties of Turkey
Treaties of Ukraine
Treaties of the United Kingdom
Violence against women in Europe
Women's rights instruments